The Great Expanse is the eighth studio album by Australian hip hop trio Hilltop Hoods, released on 22 February 2019 through Universal Music Australia. The album was produced by members Suffa (Matthew Lambert) and DJ Debris (Barry Francis), and features gold selling ARIA Award winning single "Clark Griswold" featuring Adrian Eagle, platinum single "Leave Me Lonely", and new single "Exit Sign" featuring Illy and Ecca Vandal.

The Great Expanse debuted at No. 1 on the ARIA Albums Charts, making it the group's sixth number one and setting a new ARIA record for most #1 Albums by an Australian band or group. The album was also issued on CD and vinyl.

At the ARIA Music Awards of 2019, the album was nominated for three awards. Album of the Year, Best Group and Best Hip Hop Release.

Composition
Second single "Leave Me Lonely" is about the "eternal struggle of being cornered by a close-talker". MC Pressure told The Music that while "Leave Me Lonely" is the "fastest song on the record", "there are a few other party banger style songs that it fits in nicely with. The album as a whole, however, varies from dark and moody to fun and upbeat throughout."

Track listing
Track listing adapted from iTunes.

Personnel
Hilltop Hoods
 Suffa (Matthew David Lambert) – vocals, engineering, mixing, producing
 Pressure (Daniel Howe Smith) – vocals
 DJ Debris (Barry John M Francis) – producing, engineering, turntablism

Additional musicians
 Ecca Vandal – guest vocals on track 4 and 6
 Nyassa – guest vocals on track 4 and 12
 Timberwolf – guest vocals on track 5
 Illy – guest vocals on track 6
 Adrian Eagle – guest vocals on track 7
 Ruel – guest vocals on track 10

Charts

Weekly charts

Year-end charts

Certifications

References

2019 albums
Hilltop Hoods albums